Słocin  is a village in the administrative district of Gmina Grodzisk Wielkopolski, within Grodzisk Wielkopolski County, Greater Poland Voivodeship, in west-central Poland.

The village has a population of 591.

References

Villages in Grodzisk Wielkopolski County